Chaparral is a town and municipality in the Tolima department of Colombia.

Population
The population of the municipality was 40,880 as of the 1993 census. The 2017 census had a total population of 47,293

References

Municipalities of Tolima Department